The 1927 U.S. Open was the 31st U.S. Open, held June 14–17 at Oakmont Country Club in Oakmont, Pennsylvania, a suburb northeast of Pittsburgh. Tommy Armour defeated Harry Cooper in an 18-hole playoff to win the first of his three major titles.

The surprise second round leader was amateur Jimmy Johnston, who won the U.S. Amateur two years later in 1929. In the third round on Thursday morning, he suffered two double bogeys on the front-nine, carded an 87 (+15), and finished in 19th place. Gene Sarazen, Walter Hagen, Bill Mehlhorn, and Emmet French were all in contention in the final round, but only French managed to break 40 on the back nine. Tommy Armour shot a final round 76 and 301 total, while Harry Cooper shot 77. Armour needed a  putt for birdie on the par-4 18th to tie Cooper and force a playoff. Neither player managed to break par during any round in the tournament.

Both players were tied after nine holes of the Friday playoff, even though they only halved one hole. Cooper then took a two-shot lead, but an Armour birdie at 13 and a Cooper bogey at 15 brought the match to all square. On the 16th, Cooper found a bunker off the tee and recorded a double bogey, while Armour made par to gain a two-stroke advantage did not relinquish. Armour finished with a 76 to Cooper's 79.

Armour's winning score of 301 was the highest since 1919, and the last time the winning score exceeded 300 strokes. Only one round under 70 was recorded, Al Espinosa's 69 in the final round. After Armour, no foreign-born player won the U.S. Open for another 38 years, until Gary Player in 1965. England's Ted Ray, the 1920 champion, played in his first Open since his win; it would also be his last. The 12th hole at Oakmont measured , the longest in U.S. Open history until 1955.

While Armour won two more majors, Cooper never won one. His 31 PGA Tour victories are the most by a player without a major win, and he is often cited as the "best player to never win a major."

Defending champion Bobby Jones and Eddie Jones shared low-amateur honors and tied for eleventh. It was the only time in his eleven U.S. Open appearances that Bobby Jones finished outside the top ten.

This was the first U.S. Open held at Oakmont, which hosted its ninth in 2016. It has also hosted three PGA Championships; the first in 1922 was a match play event won by Gene Sarazen.

This was the last U.S. Open to commence on Tuesday; the following year the first round was scheduled for Thursday.

Past champions in the field

Made the cut 

Source:

Missed the cut 

Source:

Round summaries

First round
Tuesday, June 14, 1927

Source:

Second round
Wednesday, June 15, 1927

Source:

Third round
Thursday, June 16, 1927 (morning)

Source:

Final round
Thursday, June 16, 1927 (afternoon)

Source:

Playoff 
Friday, June 17, 1927

Source:

Scorecard

Source:

References

External links
USGA Championship Database
USOpen.com - 1927

U.S. Open (golf)
Golf in Pennsylvania
U.S. Open
U.S. Open
U.S. Open
June 1927 sports events